Melvin Bibo is a Nigerian freestyle wrestler. He won one of the bronze medals in the men's 74 kg event at the 2014 Commonwealth Games and the silver medal in the men's 86 kg event at the 2018 Commonwealth Games.

In 2016, he won one of the bronze medals in the men's 74 kg event at the 2016 African Wrestling Championships. At the 2018 African Wrestling Championships he won the gold medal in the men's 86 kg event. The following year at the 2019 African Wrestling Championships he won one of the bronze medals in the men's 86 kg event.

References

External links 
 

Living people
Year of birth missing (living people)
Place of birth missing (living people)
Nigerian male sport wrestlers
Wrestlers at the 2014 Commonwealth Games
Wrestlers at the 2018 Commonwealth Games
Commonwealth Games medallists in wrestling
Commonwealth Games silver medallists for Nigeria
Commonwealth Games bronze medallists for Nigeria
African Wrestling Championships medalists
African Games medalists in wrestling
African Games gold medalists for Nigeria
Competitors at the 2015 African Games
21st-century Nigerian people
Medallists at the 2014 Commonwealth Games
Medallists at the 2018 Commonwealth Games